Zameer: The Awakening of a Soul is a 1997 Indian Hindi-language drama film directed by Rajat Rawail and written by Rumi Jaffery, starring Sanjay Kapoor and Shilpa Shetty. It premiered on 16 May 1997 in Mumbai.

Cast
 Sanjay Kapoor as Kishan
 Shilpa Shetty as Roma Khurana
 Paresh Rawal as Raja Gajraj Singh
 Laxmikant Berde as Beparwah
 Om Puri as Jaichand Marwah
 Gulshan Grover as Ranjit Khurana
 Satyajeet Puri as Satyakam
 Kader Khan as Astrologer Ram Prasad
 Shakti Kapoor as Chedhi Lal
 Asrani as Babu
 Yunus Parvez as Minister
 Kulbhushan Kharbanda as Teacher

Soundtrack

External links
 

1997 films
1997 drama films
1990s Hindi-language films
Films scored by Anand–Milind
Films set in Uttar Pradesh
Films set in Mumbai
Indian drama films
Hindi-language drama films